Difenacoum is an anticoagulant of the 4-hydroxycoumarin vitamin K antagonist type. It has anticoagulant effects and is used commercially as a rodenticide. It was first introduced in 1976 and first registered in the USA in 2007.

Formulation
Difenacoum is sold as blue-green and red pellets.

Uses
Difenacoum was first introduced in 1976 as a rodenticide effective against rats and mice which were resistant to other anticoagulants.

Safety treatment and toxicity
Because other species of mammals and birds may prey upon affected rodents, or directly ingest rodenticide bait, there is a risk of primary, secondary or tertiary exposure; examples are described in a 2012 publication on veterinary toxicology.
Using radiolabeled isotopes, difenacoum (and/or its metabolites) has been shown to be distributed across many organ tissues upon oral ingestion, with the highest concentrations occurring in the liver and pancreas.

Difenacoum has been shown to be highly toxic to some species of freshwater fish and green algae despite the fact that difenacoum is weakly soluble in aqueous solutions.

Diagnosis Symptoms and Treatment

Vitamin K deficiency in animals is deliberately brought about by anticoagulant rodenticide toxicities. Vitamin K deficiency causes internal bleeding and hemorrhaging, resulting in a slow, painful death. Other vitamin K deficient states include: biliary obstruction, intrahepatic cholestasis, intestinal malabsorption and chronic oral antibiotic administration. These are objectives of these poisons, as the sick animal normally stays in its nest, removing the need to clean up/dispose of dead animals. Often the target animals will remain healthy enough to feed several times and possibly bring poisoned foods back to feed their young. The poison is effectively transferred through milk of mothers to nursing mammalian infants. 

Treatment: Vitamin K reverses the anticoagulant effect of rodenticides over a period of 24 to 48 hours from initiation of therapy. Caught early enough, Vitamin K can be rapidly administered by subcutaneous injection and followed up with by food-based supplements.

References

Coumarin drugs
Tetralins
Biphenyls
Anticoagulant rodenticides
4-Hydroxycoumarins